Dr. Hackenstein is a 1988 comedy horror film written and directed by Richard Clark and distributed by Troma Entertainment. After the death of his wife, Dr. Hackenstein (David Muir) concocts the perfect plan: with the help of a few graverobbers and a couple of lost girls, he can use the spare parts to reanimate his dead spouse and build a better woman.

Comedian Phyllis Diller has a small part in the movie, along with Oscar nominee Anne Ramsey (d. 1988) in her last role.

It was shown at Cannes Film Festival in May, 1989, having been released on home video in January. Shooting was comparatively swift, principal photography having begun in May the previous year. It was given a commercial re-release fifteen years later (2004), on DVD format.

The film's visible contemporary influences include Re-Animator and Young Frankenstein. Critic Sandra Brennan characterized it as a parody of the "Frankenstein" films. Identifying it as "among the first films to blend pure gore with slapstick comedy", Rotten Tomatoes deemed it a precursor and trendsetter to later films, such as Scary Movie, which draw on those genres.

DVD Verdict columnist David Johnson, though singling out production values as impressive within its low-budget class, found the gore–comedy outing failed to succeed on either count. Bill Gibron of DVD Talk wrote similarly unenthusiastically that its flashes of wit and effective segments notwithstanding, the romance and physical humor plot elements were ineffective, ultimately concluding it lay "somewhere in the middle between complete piece of crap and pretty cool comedy".

References

External links

  Dr. Hackenstein Troma Entertainment

1988 films
1980s comedy horror films
American comedy horror films
American independent films
Troma Entertainment films
1988 comedy films
1980s English-language films
1980s American films